Camille Bilger (17 October 1879 – 2 March 1947) was a French politician. He served as a member of the Chamber of Deputies from 1919 to 1936, representing Haut-Rhin.

References

1879 births
1947 deaths
Politicians from Mulhouse
People from Alsace-Lorraine
Republican Federation politicians
Popular Democratic Party (France) politicians
Members of the 12th Chamber of Deputies of the French Third Republic
Members of the 13th Chamber of Deputies of the French Third Republic
Members of the 14th Chamber of Deputies of the French Third Republic
Members of the 15th Chamber of Deputies of the French Third Republic
French Confederation of Christian Workers members